Lembah Impiana is a suburb of Kulim District, Kedah, Malaysia.

Economy
the suburb has its own commercial center, it also treated as one-stop center for food, because several cafe and restaurant can found there.

See also
 Butterworth–Kulim Expressway
 Northern Corridor Economic Region
 Penang

References

External links
 Lembah Impiana Facebook

Populated places in Kedah